This is a list of members of the Provincial Assembly of Estonia. On 12 April 1917, a decree issued by the Provisional Government in Russia created the autonomous Governorate of Estonia with its own Governor and a Provincial Assembly (or Council; Maanõukogu, but commonly known as the Maapäev) to be composed of elected members. The elections took place on 5 June 1917, and the Assembly convened on 14 July. On 28 November, it declared its laws sovereign over Estonia and moved to create a Constituent Assembly; once that was established and its members elected, the Provisional Assembly ceased to exist and its session ended on 23 April 1919.

Officers 
Source: Jaan Toomla, Valitud ja Valitsenud: Eesti parlamentaarsete ja muude esinduskogude ning valitsuste isikkoosseis aastail 1917–1999 (National Library of Estonia, 1999), p. 22.

Chairman 
14 July 1917 – 25 October 1917: Artur Vallner

25 October 1917 – 27 November 1918: Otto Strandman

27 November 1918 – 3 February 1919: Ado Birk

3 February 1919 – 23 April 1919: Karl Parts

First Assistant Chairman 
27 July 1917 – 25 October 1917: Jaan Teemant

25 October 1917 – 27 November 1918: Jüri Jaakson

27 November 1918 – 3 February 1919: Karl August Baars

3 February 1919 – 23 April 1919: Julius Seljamaa

Second Assistant Chairman 
27 July 1917 – 25 October 1917: Jüri Vilms

25 October 1917 – 27 November 1918: Nikolai Köstner

27 November 1918 – 3 February 1919: Karl Saral

3 February 1919 – 23 April 1919: Peeter Põld

Temporary Secretary 
14 July 1917 – 27 July 1917: Ado Birk

14 July 1917 – 27 July 1917: Julius Seljamaa

Secretary 
27 July 1917 – 25 October 1917: Mart Kiirats

25 October 1917 – 16 February 1918: Herman Kask

27 November 1918 – 23 April 1919: Karl Ast

Second Assistant Secretary 
27 July 1917 – 25 October 1917: Rudolf Jaska

25 October 1917 – 27 November 1918: Hugo Raudsepp

27 November 1918 – 3 February 1919: Victor Neggo

3 February 1919 – 23 April 1919: Jüri Parik

Second Assistant Secretary 
27 July 1917 – 25 October 1917: Herman Kask

25 October 1917 – 27 November 1918: Victor Neggo

27 November 1918 – 23 April 1919: Hugo Raudsepp

Members 
Source: Jaan Toomla, Valitud ja Valitsenud: Eesti parlamentaarsete ja muude esinduskogude ning valitsuste isikkoosseis aastail 1917–1999 (National Library of Estonia, 1999), pp. 22–24.

References 

Lists of political office-holders in Estonia